The arrondissement of Bobigny is an arrondissement of France in the Seine-Saint-Denis department in the Île-de-France region. It has 9 communes.

Composition

The communes of the arrondissement of Bobigny, and their INSEE codes, are:

 Bagnolet (93006)
 Bobigny (93008)
 Bondy (93010)
 Les Lilas (93045)
 Montreuil (93048)
 Noisy-le-Sec (93053)
 Pantin (93055)
 Le Pré-Saint-Gervais (93061)
 Romainville (93063)

History

The arrondissement of Bobigny was created in 1964 as part of the department Seine. In 1968 it became part of the new department Seine-Saint-Denis. The arrondissement of Saint-Denis was created in February 1993 from part of the arrondissement of Bobigny. At the January 2017 reorganisation of the arrondissements of Seine-Saint-Denis, it lost six communes to the arrondissement of Le Raincy.

As a result of the reorganisation of the cantons of France which came into effect in 2015, the borders of the cantons are no longer related to the borders of the arrondissements. The cantons of the arrondissement of Bobigny were, as of January 2015:

 Bagnolet
 Bobigny
 Bondy-Nord-Ouest
 Bondy-Sud-Est
 Le Bourget
 Drancy
 Les Lilas
 Montreuil-Est
 Montreuil-Nord
 Montreuil-Ouest
 Noisy-le-Sec
 Pantin-Est
 Pantin-Ouest
 Les Pavillons-sous-Bois
 Romainville
 Rosny-sous-Bois
 Villemomble

References

Bobigny